"Roving Gypsy Boy" is a song recorded by Canadian music group The Rankin Family. It was released in 1996 as the first single from their greatest hits album, Collection. It peaked in the top 10 on the RPM Country Tracks chart.

Chart performance

References

1996 songs
1996 singles
The Rankin Family songs
EMI Records singles
Songs written by Jimmy Rankin